The Remission Flow was an Irish Christian rock worship band from Monaghan, Ireland, and they formed in 2010 and disbanded in 2014. Their members are  Darren Mulligan, Trevor Brimage, Mark Allister, Raymond Douglas, Mark Mulligan, Lorraine Brimage, and Heidi Mulligan. They released, The Light That Floods, with 7Core Music, in 2012. The same label released, Rhythms of Grace, in 2014.

Background
The Christian rock worship band formed in Monaghan, Ireland, in 2012. The band members was leading vocalist and guitarist, Darren Mulligan, guitarist and background vocalist, Trevor Brimage, bass guitarist, Mark Allister, keyboardist, Raymond Douglas, drummer, Mark Mulligan, and background vocalists, Lorraine Brimage and Heidi Mulligan. The group disbanded in October 2014 because Darren and his wife, Heidi, signed a record deal with Word Records, where they formed the new band, We Are Messengers, in Nashville, Tennessee.

Music history
The group formed in 2012, with their first studio album, The Light That Floods, released by 7Core Music on 15 October 2012. Their second album with the aforementioned label, Rhythms of Grace, released on 22 April 2014.

Members
Members
 Darren Mulligan – lead vocals, guitar
 Trevor Brimage – guitar, background vocals
 Mark Allister – bass
 Raymond Douglas – keys
 Mark Mulligan – drums
 Lorraine Brimage – background vocals
 Heidi Mulligan – background vocals

Discography
Studio albums
 The Light That Floods (15 October 2012, 7Core)
 Rhythms of Grace (22 April 2014, 7Core)

References

External links
 Cross Rhythms artist profile
 New Release Tuesday artist profile
       

Musical groups established in 2012   
Musical groups disestablished in 2014
Irish rock music groups
Musical groups from County Monaghan
2012 establishments in Ireland